Gluconobacter is a genus of bacteria in the acetic acid bacteria family. They prefer sugar-rich environments,  so are sometimes found as a spoilage organism in beer. They are not known to be pathogenic but can cause rot in apples and pears. They are used alone with acetobacter for microbial degradation of ethanol

Species

A number of species are in the genus, such as:

 Gluconobacter albidus
 Gluconobacter asaii
 Gluconobacter cerevisiae was isolated from fermenting lambic beer in 2014 and proposed as a new species.
 Gluconobacter cerinus
 Gluconobacter frateurii
 Gluconobacter japonicus
 Gluconobacter kanchanaburiensis
 Gluconobacter kondonii
 Gluconobacter nephelii
 Gluconobacter oxydans is probably the best known, because it has a number of applications in biotechnology.
 Gluconobacter sphaericus
 Gluconobacter thailandicus
 Gluconobacter uchimurae
 Gluconobacter wancherniae

References

Rhodospirillales
Bacteria genera